Union Street may refer to:

Singapore 
Union Street, Singapore

United Kingdom 
Union Street, Aberdeen, Scotland
Union Street, East Sussex, between Ticehurst and Flimwell
Union Street, London
Union Street, Plymouth, Devon
Union Street, Reading, Berkshire
Union Street, Glasgow, Scotland

United States 
Union Street (San Francisco)
Union Street Park, a former baseball ground in Wilmington, Delaware
Union Street (Boston)
Union Street station (BMT Fourth Avenue Line), a station of the New York City Subway
Union Street station (BMT Fifth Avenue Line), a closed station of the New York City Subway

Other uses 
Union Street (album), an album by Erasure
Union Street (novel), a novel by Pat Barker